United Nations Security Council Resolution 175, adopted on September 12, 1962, after examining the application of the State of Trinidad and Tobago for membership in the United Nations the Council recommended to the General Assembly that the State of Trinidad and Tobago be admitted.

The resolution was adopted unanimously.

See also
List of United Nations Security Council Resolutions 101 to 200 (1953–1965)

References
Text of the Resolution at undocs.org

External links
 

 0175
History of Trinidad and Tobago
Trinidad and Tobago and the United Nations
 0175
1962 in Trinidad and Tobago
 0175
September 1962 events